The 2021 NC State Wolfpack women's soccer team represented NC State University during the 2021 NCAA Division I women's soccer season. The Wolfpack were led by head coach Tim Santoro, in his tenth season. They played home games at Dail Soccer Field. This was the team's 38th season playing organized women's college soccer and their 35th playing in the Atlantic Coast Conference.

The Wolfpack finished the season 9–9–2 overall and 4–6–0 in ACC play to finish in a tie for ninth place.  They did not qualify for the ACC Tournament.  They received an at-large bid to the NCAA Tournament.  As an unseeded team in the Florida State Bracket they defeated South Florida in the First Round before losing to fourth seed Pepperdine in the Second Round to end their season.

Previous season 

Due to the COVID-19 pandemic, the ACC played a reduced schedule in 2020 and the NCAA Tournament was postponed to 2021. The ACC did not play a spring league schedule, but did allow teams to play non-conference games that would count toward their 2020 record in the lead up to the NCAA Tournament.

The Wolfpack did not play in the fall season. However, they did resume play for the spring non-conference season.

The Wolfpack finished the spring season 5–3–1 and did not receive an at-large invitation to the NCAA Tournament. Their non-invitation broke a four-year streak of being invited to the tournament.

Squad

Roster

Team Management

Source:

Schedule

Source:

|-
!colspan=6 style=""| Exhibition

|-
!colspan=6 style=""| Non-Conference Regular season

|-
!colspan=6 style=""| ACC Regular season

|-
!colspan=6 style=""| NCAA Tournament

Rankings

References

NC State
NC State
2021
NC State women's soccer
NC State